Monique Cornelia Annamaria Velzeboer (born in Oud Ade on 18 October 1969) is a Dutch skater and photographer.

At the Winter Olympics in Calgary in 1988 she won Gold, silver and bronze in the short track skating discipline, when short-track speed skating was held as a demonstration sport. She ranked also 4th in the 500 metres of the 1992 Winter Olympics. Her life as an elite sport star ended early, during a training for the 1994 Winter Olympics Monique had a bad fall in Font-Romeu and she broke both her wrists and became paraplegic.

After a difficult period Monique is now full of life. Monique is a photographer and travels around the world to the most impressive places to photograph, she was already in Mexico, India, Rwanda, Bangladesh and Nepal. Monique photographs for the Liliane Fund, a Fund which is committed to children with disabilities in developing countries. Through the Monique Velzeboer Foundation, she sells photos, calendars, cards and the proceeds are going to the Liliane Fund.

Her three siblings, Simone, Mark and Alex were also speed skaters. As are her nieces Xandra and Michelle.

References

External links
Monique Velzeboer Foundation
 Monique Velzeboer Photography

1969 births
Living people
Dutch female speed skaters
Olympic speed skaters of the Netherlands
Speed skaters at the 1988 Winter Olympics
Speed skaters at the 1992 Winter Olympics
People from Kaag en Braassem
Medalists at the 1988 Winter Olympics
Olympic gold medalists for the Netherlands
Olympic silver medalists for the Netherlands
Olympic bronze medalists for the Netherlands
Dutch female short track speed skaters
Olympic medalists in speed skating
Sportspeople from South Holland
21st-century Dutch women
20th-century Dutch women